Peter Nigrini is an American projection designer live theater.  His best-known designs include Dear Evan Hansen, Fela!, and Here Lies Love.  He also works occasionally as a scenic and lighting designer, most notably his longstanding collaboration with Nature Theater of Oklahoma.   He is also a lecturer at New York University

Education
Nigrini earned his bachelor's degree at Dartmouth College and later received a master's degree at the Central St. Martins College of Art (London) in scenography.

Broadway
 MJ the Musical
 Beetlejuice
 Ain't Too Proud
 SpongeBob SquarePants
 A Doll's House, Part 2
 Amélie
 Dear Evan Hansen
 An Act of God
 The Heidi Chronicles
 Fela!
 The Best Man
 9 to 5: The Musical

Off-Broadway and Regional
 Man in the Ring - Huntington Theatre Company
 The Skin of Our Teeth - Theatre for a New Audience
 Wakey Wakey - Signature Theatre Company (New York City)
 Here Lies Love - The Public Theater, Royal National Theatre, Seattle Repertory Theatre
 Grounded - The Public Theater
 Our Lady of Kibeho - Signature Theatre Company
 Far from Heaven - Playwrights Horizons
 Notes from Underground - Yale Repertory Theater
 Autumn Sonata - Yale Repertory Theater
 In a Year of 13 Moons - Yale Repertory Theater
 The Elaborate Entrance of Chad Deity - Second Stage Theatre

Opera, Music, Dance
 Deep Blue Sea for the Park Avenue Armory with the Bill T. Jones/Arnie Zane Dance Company
 Orfeo ed Euridice for the Opera Theatre of Saint Louis
 Lucia di Lammermoor for the Santa Fe Opera
 Don Giovanni for the Santa Fe Opera
 Real Enemies at the Brooklyn Academy of Music
 The Grace Jones Hurricane Tour at Hammerstein Ballroom
 Blind Date with the Bill T. Jones/Arnie Zane Dance Company

Nature Theater of Oklahoma

Peter is a founding member of the much lauded New York avant-garde theater troupe Nature Theater of Oklahoma.  He is the sole designer for the company and as such is responsible for every visual aspect of their productions.  For them he has designed:

 The Poetics: a ballet brut
 No Dice
 Romeo and Juliet
 Rambo Solo
 Life and Times, Episodes 1-9

Awards and nominations

 Tony (nomination) for MJ 
 Tony (nomination) for Ain't Too Proud (musical)
 Tony (nomination) for Beetlejuice (musical)
 Drama Desk Award (nomination) for Beetlejuice (musical)
 Outer Critics Circle Award (nomination) for Beetlejuice (musical)
 Henry Hewes Award for Dear Evan Hansen
 Outer Critics Circle Award (nomination) for Grounded 
 Outer Critics Circle Award (nomination) for Dear Evan Hansen
 Drama Desk Award (nomination) for Dear Evan Hansen
 Lucille Lortel Award for Grounded
 Obie Award for Life and Times
 Obie Award for No Dice
 Henry Hewes Award for Here Lies Love
 Drama Desk Award for Here Lies Love

References

External links
 
 
 

Living people
American theatre people
American scenic designers
Broadway projection and video designers
New York University faculty
Dartmouth College alumni
Year of birth missing (living people)